Anne Louis François de Paule Lefèvre d'Ormesson de Noyseau (known as Monsieur de Noiseau), (26 February 1753 - 20 April 1794) was a French deputy, librarian, and Hellenist. From 1789 to 1792 he was director of the Bibliotheque du Roi (Royal Library), the precursor to the Bibliothèque nationale de France. He died on the guillotine in Paris, accused of being a royalist.

Biography

Louis entered the same parliament on 6 September 1770 and was a councillor until it dissolved in 1771. He became Président à mortier (presiding member) on 15 March 1779, taking over the position previously held by his father.

On 7 May 1789 he was elected with 113 of 200 votes to the Estates-General as a deputy for the nobility, from the Paris-Hors-les-Murs (Paris outside the walls) constituency, by the prévôts and other aristocracy of Paris. He was part of the ecclesiastical committee that produced the law on the Civil Constitution of the Clergy adopted by the Assembly, and also one of the deputies brought back to Paris with the king on 6 October 1789 after the Women's March on Versailles. He favored the "vote par tête", one deputy one vote, as opposed to the weighted system then in effect. He opposed the abolition of feudal rights, and signed the protests of 12 and 15 September 1791 against the decisions of the Constituent Assembly. His term ended on 30 September 1791 when the new constitution took effect, creating the National Assembly.

He succeeded Jean-Charles-Pierre Lenoir in 1790 at the Royal  Library and was there until August 1792, when he became  a member of the commission of public monuments, and of the Académie des Inscriptions et Belles-Lettres as a distinguished Hellenist.

He was arrested in December 1793 as a royalist along with Jean Baptiste Gaspard Bochart de Saron. He was brought before the Revolutionary Tribunal, and condemned to death for having signed a protest against the abolition of the parliaments. Lefèvre d'Ormesson was executed along with twenty-one other deputies of the old parliaments of Paris and Toulouse on 1 Floréal, Year II.

He married Anne-Louise-Reine-Jeanne Lyon Baillon in 1779. He had no children.

Bibliography

References

Members of the National Constituent Assembly (France)
French librarians
French people executed by guillotine during the French Revolution
Members of the Académie des Inscriptions et Belles-Lettres
1753 births
1794 deaths
French translators
Greek–French translators